The March on the Pentagon was a massive demonstration against the Vietnam War on October 21, 1967. The protest involved more than 100,000 attendees at a rally by the Lincoln Memorial. Later about 50,000 people marched across the Potomac River to The Pentagon and sparked a confrontation with paratroopers on guard. The demonstrations were highly polarizing, and also produced the famous photograph of a protester placing flowers in a paratroopers' rifle.

Following a concert by Phil Ochs, as well as speeches from David Dellinger and Dr. Benjamin Spock, around 50,000 of those attending were then led by social activist Abbie Hoffman and marched from the Lincoln Memorial to The Pentagon in nearby Arlington, Virginia to participate in a second rally.

Background

In the evening of January 14, 1967 various countercultural figures celebrating the Human Be-In converged in artist Michael Bowen’s San Francisco painting studio. Bowen's guests in the room included Allen Ginsberg, Gary Snyder, Timothy Leary, and Jerry Rubin. The small group would eventually conceive of a plan to make a protest march to the Pentagon, Gary Snyder would suggest the need for an exorcism of the Pentagon and Michael Bowen would suggest the purpose of the march be to actually levitate the building.

Hoping to attract young, educated college students, Mobe coordinator David Dellinger appointed Jerry Rubin, who led the large Vietnam Day Committee at the University of California, Berkeley, to organize a march. Abbie Hoffman had recently joined Mobe after previous experience in the civil rights movement. After a spiritual retreat to Mexico Michael Bowen would join in on a meeting in New York City to plan the march. Out of all the activists in the room he was the only one who argued that the Pentagon would be literally levitated, while the others only claimed it would be "levitated" for shock value.

Protest
On October 21, 1967 the National Mobilization Committee to End the War in Vietnam started the protest with a rally at the Lincoln Memorial. The attendees were socially diverse ranging from middle class professionals, clergymen, hippies, and black activists. The initial rally, which was galvanized by a concert performance from counterculture folk singer Phil Ochs, and featured serious as well as antic-laced speeches. Notable people such as Norman Mailer, Robert Lowell, Dwight MacDonald, Noam Chomsky, and Paul Goodman were in attendance.

From the Lincoln Memorial protesters then marched towards the Pentagon. As the protesters neared the Pentagon, they were met by soldiers of the 82nd Airborne Division who formed a human barricade blocking the Pentagon steps. Not to be dissuaded, Abbie Hoffman vowed to levitate the Pentagon claiming he would attempt to use psychic energy to levitate the Pentagon until it would turn orange and begin to vibrate, at which time the war in Vietnam would end. Allen Ginsberg led Tibetan chants to assist Hoffman.

Some protesters tried to rush inside the Pentagon but were prevented. Tear gas and rifle butts were then used to beat back the crowd. Protesters faced down troops with bayonets for hours, around midnight troops chased most protesters away.

Gallery

See also
 Flower Power (photograph)

References

1967 in the United States
1967 protests
Protests against the Vietnam War
United States in the Vietnam War